Denis Podalydès (born 22 April 1963) is a French actor and scriptwriter of Greek descent. Podalydès has appeared in more than 140 films and television shows since 1989. He starred in The Officers' Ward, which was entered into the 2001 Cannes Film Festival.

Career
He is a former student of the Paris Conservatoire national supérieur d'art dramatique, and became a pensionnaire of the Comédie-Française in 1997, and then a sociétaire in 2000, now considered as one of their major actors. He became the 505th sociétaire on 1st January 2000. Before joining that company he had appeared in Sophonisbe by Corneille (1988), L'Épreuve and Les Sincères by Marivaux (1989), La Double Inconstance by Marivaux and Ruy Blas by Victor Hugo (1990), Le Misanthrope by Molière, and Bérénice by Racine (1992), Les Fausses Confidences by Marivaux (1992), and Anatol by Arthur Schnitzler in 1995.

Director 
From 2006, he began directing for the stage, with several classics: Cyrano de Bergerac by Edmond Rostand, then in 2008 Fantasio by Alfred de Musset. 
In 2011, with Emmanuel Bourdieu and Éric Ruf, staged Le Cas Jekyll by Christine Montalbetti In 2012, he directed the opera Don Pasquale by Gaetano Donizetti at the Théâtre des Champs-Élysées. In February 2013, he directed L'Homme qui se hait, by Emmanuel Bourdieu at the Théâtre national de Chaillot. Podalydès directed the 2017 production of Rossini's Le Comte Ory at the Opéra Comique, Paris.

Filmography

Theater
He was a Sociétaire of the Comédie-Française from 1997 to 2000.

References

External links

1963 births
Living people
French male film actors
People from Versailles
French people of Greek descent
Sociétaires of the Comédie-Française
20th-century French male actors
21st-century French male actors
French National Academy of Dramatic Arts alumni
Cours Florent alumni
French male screenwriters
French screenwriters
Audiobook narrators